Caloptilia aeneocapitella is a moth of the family Gracillariidae. It is known from Puerto Rico and Saint Vincent and the Grenadines.

References

aeneocapitella
Moths of North America
Moths described in 1891